The Code House, near Walton, Kentucky, was built around 1860.  It was listed on the National Register of Historic Places in 2005.

It is a one-a-and-half-story saddlebag house on a stone foundation with clapboard siding.  It has a spindlework porch which was added c.1890.

References

National Register of Historic Places in Boone County, Kentucky
Greek Revival houses in Kentucky
Houses completed in 1860
1860 establishments in Kentucky
Houses in Boone County, Kentucky
Houses on the National Register of Historic Places in Kentucky